Muar may refer to
 Muar District, a district in Johor, Malaysia
 Muar (town), a town in the Muar District
 Muar (federal constituency), a parliament federal constituency in Johor, Malaysia
 Muar River (Malaysia), is a river which flows through Muar District, Malaysia

Other 
 Muar River (Mozambique), is a stream which flows through in Sofala province, Mozambique

See also 
 Muar Municipal Council
 Muar Municipal Council FC
 Muar Bypass
 Muar State Railway
 Muar Trade Centre